Marco Papa (16 March 1958 in Perugia, Umbria, Italy, – 9 September 1999 near Adro Italy) was a Grand Prix motorcycle road racer. His most successful year was in 1990 when he finished in 13th place in the 500cc world championship aboard a Moto Club Perugia sponsored Honda NS500. Papa perished in a road accident in September 1999. A Turn was dedicated to him at Magione circuit near Perugia.

Career statistics

Grand Prix motorcycle racing

Races by year
(key) (Races in bold indicate pole position) (Races in italics indicate fastest lap)

Superbike World Championship

Races by year
(key) (Races in bold indicate pole position) (Races in italics indicate fastest lap)

External links
Official MotoGP website Marco Papa profile

References

1958 births
1999 deaths
Sportspeople from Perugia
Italian motorcycle racers
250cc World Championship riders
500cc World Championship riders
Road incident deaths in Italy